Lars Johan Rudman Bergenstråhle (15 July 1935 – 23 August 1995) was a Swedish film director and screenwriter. He directed 14 films between 1965 and 1994. His 1969 film Made in Sweden was entered into the 19th Berlin International Film Festival, where it won a Silver Bear award. His 1972 film Foreigners won the award for Best Director at the 9th Guldbagge Awards.

Selected filmography
 Made in Sweden (1969)
 A Baltic Tragedy (1970)
 Foreigners (1972)
 Hello Baby (1976)

References

External links

1935 births
1995 deaths
Swedish film directors
Swedish male screenwriters
Best Director Guldbagge Award winners
20th-century Swedish screenwriters
20th-century Swedish male writers